The word "pax" together with the Latin name of an empire or nation is used to refer to a period of peace or at least stability, enforced by a hegemon, a so-called Pax imperia ("Imperial peace").

The following is a list of periods of regional peace, sorted by alphabetical order. The corresponding hegemon is stated in parenthesis.

See also
 Regional hegemony
 
 Pacification

References 

Historical eras

Society-related lists